Brig. General (Retd) Mohammad Enamul Huq is a Bangladesh Awami League politician. He was State Minister of Power, Energy and Mineral Resources in Second Hasina Cabinet.

Early life 
Huq was born on 10 January 1947.

Career 
Huq served as a commissioned officer in the Bangladesh Army. He retired as a Brigadier General. He was elected to Parliament from Chapai Nawabganj-1 as a candidate of Bangladesh Awami League in 2008.

References

Awami League politicians
Living people
State Ministers of Power, Energy and Mineral Resources
9th Jatiya Sangsad members
Bangladesh Army brigadiers
Year of birth missing (living people)
Comilla Victoria Government College alumni